7 Minster Yard is an historic building in the city of York, North Yorkshire, England. A Grade II listed building, located in Minster Yard, the building dates to around 1730. It was formerly part of the prebendal house of Strensall.

The front is two storeys with two canted and pedimented bay windows on each floor. These, and the central door-case, date to the early 1800s.

The property adjoins 1 Deangate.

References

An Inventory of the City of York V Central, (1981), p. 164

7
Houses in North Yorkshire
Buildings and structures in North Yorkshire
18th-century establishments in England
Grade II listed buildings in York
Grade II listed houses
18th century in York